This is a list of monetary reformers from the past to the present according to several schools of thought.

Monetary reformers primarily belong to the following groups:
Supporters of publicly issued money who oppose charging interest on issuance of money, formerly called "Greenbackers" in late 19th century United States, 
the Austrian School who generally support a return to the gold standard or full-reserve banking, and  
the Post-Keynesian School who generally wish to regulate or reduce leverage and debt in the economy or direct it to "productive, non-speculative" uses.

Most of these groups are critical of fractional-reserve banking, a practice which is described by critics as "creating money out of thin air". According to the Bank of England "rather than banks lending out deposits that are placed with them, the act of lending creates deposits – the reverse of the sequence typically described in textbooks".

Public, community and self-issuance of money

Publicly issued, debt-free money or interest-free credit
Ellen Brown
Jacob Coxey
Henry Clay Dean
Benjamin Franklin
Gottfried Feder
Silvio Gesell
Joseph Huber
Andrew Jackson
Dennis Kucinich
Abraham Lincoln
Gerry McGeer
James Robertson
Michael Rowbotham
James Gibb Stuart
Edmund Dick Taylor
Richard Werner
Stephen Zarlenga

Social credit
C. H. Douglas
Edmund Dwyer-Gray
George McElwee
George Gray
John Hargrave
Robert A. Heinlein
Denis Ireland
Eric de Maré
Alfred Richard Orage

Alternative, complementary, local currencies and environmentalists
Herman Daly
Richard Douthwaite
Silvio Gesell
Thomas H. Greco, Jr.
Margrit Kennedy
Bernard Lietaer
E.C. Riegel

Austrian School (gold standard or full-reserve banking supporters)
See more in list of Austrian School economists
Friedrich Hayek
Ludwig von Mises
Gary North
Ron Paul
Murray Rothbard
Peter Schiff
Jesús Huerta de Soto
G. Edward Griffin
Gerald Celente
Javier Milei

Post-Keynesians
See more in list of Post-Keynesian economists
Steve Keen
Michael Hudson

Organisations 
 International: International Movement for Monetary Reform
 Australia: Fair money. 
 Austria: Monetative. 
 Bulgaria: ЧИСТИ ПАРИ. 
 Canada: Comer. 
 Denmark: Gode Penge. 
 European Union: Positive Money Europe
 Finland: Talousdemokratia. 
 France: Mouvement Monnaie Juste. 
 Germany: Monetative.
 Greece: Fekyou. 
 Iceland: Betra Peningakerfi. 
 India: Money Reforms India. 
 Israel: שינוי-מוניטרי. 
 Ireland: Sensible Money. 
 Italy: Moneta Bene Comune. . Moneta Positiva. 
 Netherlands: Ons Geld.
 New Zealand. Positive Money NZ. 
 Poland. Pieniądz Pozytywny. 
 Portugal. Boa Moeda. 
 Slovakia. Férové Peniaze. 
 South Africa. Firstsource Money. 
 Spain. Dinero Positivo. 
 Sweden. Positiva Pengar. 
 Switzerland: Monetary Modernisation association
 Switzerland: Sovereign Money Initiative
 United Kingdom: Positive Money
 United States: American Monetary Institute
 United States: Alliance For Just Money

See also
 Monetary reform
 Money creation
 Credit theory of money
 Money as Debt
 Criticism of fractional-reserve banking
 Criticism of the Federal Reserve
 Sovereign Money Initiative
 Adair Turner, Baron Turner of Ecchinswell

References

Monetary reformers
Monetary reform
Monetary reformers